Aykhal (Ayxal) is an urban locality (an urban-type settlement) in Mirninsky District of the Sakha Republic, Russia, located  from Mirny, the administrative center of the district, in the basin of the Vilyuy River. As of the 2010 Census, its population was 13,727.

Etymology
The name derives from the Yakut word for fame.

Geography
Sokhsolookh stream is located in the Aykhal's vicinity. The name of the stream in the Yakut language means the river of death or the river of traps, in reference to a large number of reindeer who, according to local legend, have drowned while trying to cross the river ice.

History
It was founded in 1961 with the beginnings of diamond extraction from the kimberlite pipe found here. It was granted urban-type settlement status in the following year. In 1985, Yubileynaya diamond mine was opened  from Aykhal.

Administrative and municipal status
Within the framework of administrative divisions, the urban-type settlement of Aykhal, together with one rural locality (the selo of Morkoka), is incorporated within Mirninsky District as the Settlement of Aykhal. As a municipal division, the Settlement of Aykhal is incorporated within Mirninsky Municipal District as Aykhal Urban Settlement.

Economy and infrastructure
The local economy is reliant on diamond mining conducted by ALROSA at its Aykhal and Yubileynaya mines. It is served by the Aykhal Airport.

References

Notes

Sources
Official website of the Sakha Republic. Registry of the Administrative-Territorial Divisions of the Sakha Republic. Mirninsky District. 

Urban-type settlements in the Sakha Republic